The 2019–20 SHL season was the 45th season of the Swedish Hockey League (SHL). The regular season began in September 2019 and ended in March 2020; it was scheduled to be followed by the Swedish Championship playoffs and the relegation playoffs. The league consisted of 14 teams; Leksands IF returned to the SHL after two seasons in HockeyAllsvenskan, having defeated Mora IK in the 2019 SHL qualifiers. IK Oskarshamn played in the SHL for the first time in franchise history, after defeating Timrå IK in the SHL qualifiers.

On 3 March, Luleå HF won the regular season title for the third time; after a 3–0 win over Rögle BK, coupled with defeats for Skellefteå AIK (0–1 versus Frölunda HC) and Färjestad BK (1–2 versus HV71), Luleå HF held an unassailable 14-point lead with 4 matches remaining.

After the playoffs were initially delayed following the conclusion of the regular season, due to the COVID-19 pandemic in Sweden, the season was curtailed on 15 March. No Swedish champions were determined, for the first time since 1952, and the SHL featured the same teams next season.

Teams

Regular season
Each team plays 52 games, playing each of the other thirteen teams four times: twice on home ice, and twice away from home. Points are awarded for each game, where three points are awarded for winning in regulation time, two points for winning in overtime or shootout, one point for losing in overtime or shootout, and zero points for losing in regulation time. At the end of the regular season, the team that finishes with the most points is crowned the league champion.

Standings

Statistics

Scoring leaders

The following shows the top ten players who led the league in points, at the conclusion of the regular season. If two or more skaters are tied (i.e. same number of points, goals and played games), all of the tied skaters are shown.

Leading goaltenders
The following shows the top ten goaltenders who led the league in goals against average, provided that they have played at least 40% of their team's minutes, at the conclusion of the regular season.

Playoffs
Ten teams qualified for the playoffs: the top six teams in the regular season were scheduled to have a bye to the quarterfinals, while teams ranked seventh to tenth met each other (7 versus 10, 8 versus 9) in a preliminary playoff round. If the finals had occurred and led to a game seven, that game was intended to be played on 2 May 2020.

In the first round the 7th-ranked team were scheduled to meet the 10th-ranked team and the 8th-ranked team were scheduled to meet the 9th-ranked team for a place in the second round. In the second round, the top-ranked team were scheduled to meet the lowest-ranked winner of the first round, the 2nd-ranked team were scheduled to face the other winner of the first round, the 3rd-ranked team were scheduled to face the 6th-ranked team, and the 4th-ranked team were scheduled to meet the 5th-ranked team. In the third round, the highest remaining seed was scheduled to matched against the lowest remaining seed. In each round the higher-seeded team was scheduled to be awarded home advantage.

The playoffs were scheduled to be held as a best-of-three series in the eighth-finals, with the remainder of the playoffs as a best-of-seven series that followed an alternating home team format: the higher-seeded team playing at home for games 1 and 3 (plus 5 and 7 if necessary), and the lower-seeded team at home for game 2 and 4 (plus 6 if necessary). However, due to the COVID-19 pandemic in Sweden, the start of the playoffs was delayed from 14 March, to 24 March. As a result, the playoff format was altered; the eighth-finals were kept as a best-of-three series, but the remaining rounds were changed to a best-of-five series.

On 14 March, the Swedish Hockey League, citing agreement with its fourteen member teams, formally requested that the playoffs be cancelled to the Swedish Ice Hockey Association. Following a meeting the following day, the playoffs were cancelled.

SHL awards

References

External links

2019-20
SHL
2019–20 in European ice hockey leagues
SHL